Lingo Hsieh (born 13 June 1985) is a Taiwanese director and screenwriter. She is known for directing the horror film The Bride, as well as the TV series Green Door, starring Jam Hsiao.

Career
Hsieh directed her first short film in 2013 titled Doppelganger. In 2014, she directed a short film, The Bride, when still a graduate student at National Taiwan University of Arts. For the film, Hsieh collaborated with Takashige Ichise, director of the Ring, to explore the tradition of ghost marriage. She collaborated with Ichise again to develop the film for a feature-length version released in 2015, also called The Bride, starring Wu Kang-ren and Chie Tanaka. Although not as successful as The Tag-Along released the same year, the film gained financial and critical success in Taiwan.

In 2019, Hsieh adapted Joseph Chen's novel Green Door for a six-episode television series, which she also directed. Green Door aired on Public Television Service before Netflix acquired the streaming rights.

Filmography

Film

Television

Awards and nominations

References

External links

1985 births
Living people
Taiwanese film directors
Taiwanese women film directors
Taiwanese screenwriters
People from Taipei
21st-century Taiwanese women